The 1974 Virginia Slims of Washington  was a women's tennis tournament played on indoor carpet courts at the James Robinson School Field House in Fairfax, Virginia in the United States that was part of the 1974 Virginia Slims World Championship Series. It was the third edition of the tournament and was held from January 28 through February 3, 1974. First-seeded Billie Jean King won the singles title and earned $10,000 first-prize money.

Finals

Singles
 Billie Jean King defeated  Kerry Melville 6–0, 6–2

Doubles
 Billie Jean King /  Betty Stöve defeated  Françoise Dürr /  Kerry Harris 6–3, 6–4

Prize money

References

Virginia Slims of Washington
Virginia Slims of Washington
1974 in sports in Washington, D.C.
Virgin